The baked bean sandwich is a sandwich composed of baked beans between two slices of bread, which may include garnishes such as lettuce and toppings such as mayonnaise or ketchup.

Recipes for a baked bean sandwich can be traced from as early as 1909. One book entitled Cooking For Two by Janet McKenzie Hill suggests such a recipe as a "substitute for meatless cooking", and is a much more elaborate sandwich compared to its most common manifestation today.

Many early recipes describe essentially the same product that has become popular today, however in addition they incite elaborate additions of garnish and dressing. Hill suggests:

The Boston-area version of the sandwich eschews toppings and garnishes, being composed simply of baked beans between two slices of Boston brown bread.

See also

 List of sandwiches

References

Sandwich
Vegetarian sandwiches